Homalopteroides is a genus of hillstream loaches native to Southeast Asia.

Species
There are currently 11 recognized species in this genus:
 Homalopteroides avii Z. S. Randall & Page, 2014 
 Homalopteroides indochinensis Silas, 1953
 Homalopteroides modestus Vinciguerra, 1890
 Homalopteroides nebulosus Alfred, 1969
 Homalopteroides rupicola Prashad & Mukerji, 1929
 Homalopteroides smithi Hora, 1932
 Homalopteroides stephensoni Hora, 1932
 Homalopteroides tweediei Herre, 1940
 Homalopteroides wassinkii Bleeker, 1853
 Homalopteroides weberi Hora, 1932
 Homalopteroides yuwonoi Kottelat, 1998

References

Balitoridae